Adriana Marais is a South African theoretical physicist, technologist and advocate for off-world exploration. She is a director of the Foundation for Space Development Africa, an organisation aiming to send Africa's first mission to the Moon, the Africa2Moon Project. She is the founder of Proudly Human, an initiative of which is the Off-World Project, a series of habitation experiments in Earth's most extreme environments.

For her research in quantum biology and the origins of life, she received awards including the 2015 L'Oreal-UNESCO International Rising Talent Award. In 2020, she was among 5 global finalists for Women in Tech's the Most Disruptive Woman in Tech Award.

Education and career 
Marais completed a BSc Hons 1st class (theoretical physics) at the University of Cape Town (UCT) in 2004, followed by an MSc summa cum laude (quantum cryptography) at the University of KwaZulu-Natal (UKZN) in 2010. She was awarded a PhD (quantum biology) from UKZN in 2015 for her research on quantum effects in photosynthesis and her postdoctoral research focused on the origins of prebiotic molecules and life itself. She enrolled at UCT in 2019 as a PhD candidate in economics with a focus on economic systems for resource constrained environments.

During her postgraduate studies, she lectured at UKZN from 2007 - 2013 and was a visiting researcher at the Centre for Quantum Technologies, Singapore, from 2011 - 2012.

From 2017-2019, she was Head of Innovation at SAP Africa and in 2018 she joined the faculty of Singularity University. In 2019, Marais founded Proudly Human, an organisation focusing on building infrastructure and teams in extreme environments in preparation for life on the Moon, Mars and beyond, as well as to provide solutions for those living in harsh conditions here on Earth.

She is a member of the South African government advisory task team on the 4th Industrial Revolution (4IR), the combination of hardware, software, and biology with a focus on communication and connectivity.

Proudly Human 
Proudly Human’s Off-World Project will demonstrate human resilience, sustainability and community spirit in even the most extreme environments through grit, imagination, research and innovation. The project prepares for life on the Moon, Mars and beyond, as well as providing solutions for those living in harsh conditions here on Earth. Over the next few years, Proudly Human will run a series of habitation experiments, building communities and off-grid infrastructure in the most extreme environments on the planet, from the desert, to Antarctica, to under the ocean. Each experiment will last several months, generate exploration-driven innovation and research, and be filmed for a documentary series.

In 2019, Marais completed location scouts to the Antarctic interior and the Oman desert. On 1 February 2021, a global call for applications for crew for the Off-World Project opened.

Foundation for Space Development 
Marais was a special project coordinator of the Foundation for Space Development in 2016, and in 2017, became co-director with Carla Sharpe and Khutšo Ngoasheng. The organisation aims to send Africa's first mission to the Moon with the Africa2Moon Project, as well as driving projects including asteroid mining; disaster management projects based on a geo-magnetic solar climate model; and other uses for big data in space. The Foundation aims to inspire children in developing nations via education and science, and encourages technological research in areas including space research, AI and robotics and open source communication technologies.

Mars One 
In 2013, Marais volunteered for the Mars One Project, a private organisation, planning one-way trips to establish the first human settlement on Mars in 2026. Marais was shortlisted as one of 100 astronaut candidates with the project. In February 2019, however, Mars One declared bankruptcy.

Membership and recognition 
Marais has received several awards, including:
 One of 5 global finalists for Women in Tech's Most Disruptive Woman in Tech Award (2020)
 Royal Society of South Africa Meiring Naude Medal for exceptional young researcher (2016)
 Alumna of the 66th Lindau Nobel Laureate Physics program (2016)
 Global Women's Forum Rising Talent Award (2016)
 L'Oreal-UNESCO International Rising Talent Award (2015)
 Department of Science and Technology Women in Science Fellowship Award 2010

Personal life 
In 2016, Marais completed the Two Oceans 56km Ultramarathon. In 2017, she summited Uhuru Peak, Mount Kilimanjaro.

References

External links 

21st-century South African physicists
South African biologists
Living people
21st-century South African women scientists
L'Oréal-UNESCO Awards for Women in Science fellows
University of KwaZulu-Natal alumni
21st-century biologists
Year of birth missing (living people)
1983 births